Andrey Baryshpolets or Andriy Baryshpolets (born January 16, 1991, Kyiv, Ukraine) was the under 18 Ukrainian champion in 2008. He was FIDE Master in 2007, International Master in 2009 and Grandmaster in 2013. He won the 13th Parsvanth International Grandmasters Chess Tournament on 16 January 2015. He defeated Deepan Chakkravarthy (India) in the final round of the Tournament.

Notable Tournaments

References 

Living people
1991 births
Chess grandmasters
Ukrainian chess players